John Mace can refer to:

 John Mace (Australian cricketer) (1839–1906), Australian cricketer
 John Mace (English cricketer) (1828–1905), English cricketer
 John Mace (New Zealand Army officer) (born 1932), New Zealand military commander